Zarina Diyas (born 18 October 1993) is a Kazakh professional tennis player. She has been ranked as high as No. 31 in the world by the Women's Tennis Association (WTA). Diyas has won one WTA Tour singles title, at the 2017 Japan Women's Open, as well as nine singles titles on the ITF Women's Circuit.

Diyas mostly played on the ITF Circuit until 2014, her breakthrough season. During that year, she started outside the top 150, before progressing into the top 40 by September. This helped her enter tournaments on the WTA Tour more consistently, though she still plays ITF tournaments. She is one of the most successful female tennis players representing Kazakhstan, along with Elena Rybakina and Yulia Putintseva.

Diyas became a member of the Kazakhstan Fed Cup team in 2011 and is tied for her country's most singles wins with Yaroslava Shvedova, but with a much better winning percentage.

Early life
Zarina Diyas was born on 18 October 1993 in Almaty. Her mother is Aida Aulbekova, and she has a sister named Alissa. During her childhood, Diyas spent many years in the Czech Republic. She moved there with her mother and sister when she was five years old. Her mother introduced her to tennis at age six. Around 2010, she played as a member of a tennis club in Prague. She had a chance to acquire Czech citizenship but decided against it in order to keep on playing for Kazakhstan. She lived in the Czech Republic until she was 12 years old, before moving to Guangzhou, China for much of her tennis training. She later started studying psychology at university, remotely.

Junior career
Diyas reached a career-high ranking of No. 17 as a junior. She began playing on the ITF Junior Circuit, in January 2007 at the age of 13. In July of the same year, she won a low-level Grade-4 title at the Safina Cup in singles event, defeating Petra Krejsová in the final. That tournament also was her doubles debut, where she lost in the second round alongside Yuliana Umanets. She then continued to have good performances, reaching one semifinal and one final by the end of the year. The next year, she started with a strong result, winning the Grade 1 tournament Czech International Junior Indoor Championships, at her first participation of the year. In March 2008, she won her first doubles title at Grade 2 level Luxembourg Indoor Junior Open, partnering with Ksenia Lykina.

In June 2008, she made her debut at the French Open, recording her first match-win at a Grand Slam tournament over Irina-Camelia Begu, before she was defeated by Lykina in the second round. She also made her doubles major debut there, losing in the first round. Diyas then reached only the second round at Wimbledon. On her debut at the 2008 US Open and the 2009 Australian Open, she was eliminated in the first round. In June 2009, she played the French Open, her last junior tournament in both singles and doubles, where she reached the third round in singles, and lost in the first round in doubles.

Professional career

2007–09: First steps
Diyas began playing on the ITF Women's Circuit in 2007 at the age of 14. Her first attempt to play in a main draw of a professional tournament was at a $100k event in Bratislava, where she lost in the first round of qualifying. In April 2008, she received a wildcard for playing in qualification at the Prague Open but failed to qualify after a first-round loss to Klaudia Jans-Ignacik. She then made her main-draw debut at the $25k event in Astana where she also won her first title.

At her first two appearances in 2009, she reached a quarterfinal before she won another ITF title at the $25k event in Stuttgart. She then made her WTA singles debut at the Prague Open as a wildcard player, where she also marked her first win and first quarterfinal. She defeated qualifier Kristina Mladenovic and sixth seed Petra Kvitová but later was eliminated by third-seeded Iveta Benešová. The year of 2009 was important for Diyas, as it was the year when she made her first appearances at a major tournament in qualifying at the US Open. There she missed her chance to get to the main draw, losing to Chang Kai-chen in the first round of qualification.

2010: First top 10 win, top 200
In 2010, she continued to rise up the rankings, debuting in the top 200 in July. Following mixed results for the first half of the year, she reached the final at the $25k event in Rome, losing to Patricia Mayr-Achleitner. In October 2010, she left a mark at the Premier-level Kremlin Cup in Moscow. She qualified into the main draw and defeated world No. 49, Gisela Dulko, in the first round. Then, she achieved the biggest win of her career by defeating top seed and world No. 7, Jelena Janković, in the second round. However, she lost by a wide margin to Maria Kirilenko in the quarterfinal match.

2011–12: Modest results, fall in rankings, shoulder surgery
During 2011, Diyas did not progress so much, having mostly modest results. Her most significant finish was a final at the $25k Kunming event which she lost to Iryna Brémond. She then reached semifinals at the $50k event in Wenshan but was not advanced to the another quarterfinal for the rest of the year. On the WTA Tour, she won only one match, defeating Sun Shengnan in the first round of the Guangzhou International Open; but she lost in the next match to Petra Martić.

In late 2011, Diyas underwent shoulder surgery and did not play tennis for the next seven months, which caused her to fall in the rankings, dropping her outside the top 300. The following year in May, she made her return on the ITF Circuit at the Kangaroo Cup where she failed to qualify for the main draw. A month later, she won her third ITF title at the $25k event in Bukhara, not dropping a set the whole tournament. Later that year, she was advanced to the final of a $25k event in Taipei, where she lost to Zheng Saisai. The next week, she participated in a new WTA Challenger event, also in Taipei. In the first round, she defeated the world No. 40 and top seed, Peng Shuai, in straight sets. The, in the following round, she made a lopsided win over Varatchaya Wongteanchai, losing just one game. She then lost in the quarterfinals to Kurumi Nara, which would mark her last quarterfinal of the season.

2013: Back in the top 200
Diyas started season playing mostly qualifyings for WTA tournaments. She began the year ranked world No. 264 and finished more than 100 spots higher. In February, she recorded a first win on the WTA Tour in 2013, prevailing over Kristýna Plíšková in the first round of the Malaysian Open. In the second round, she was eliminated by Ashleigh Barty. She then returned to the ITF Circuit, mostly achieving modest results. Her only ITF title of the year came in October at the $25k event in Makinohara, where she defeated rising Swiss junior and future top-ten player Belinda Bencic to clinch victory. She then advanced to another ITF final at the Caesar & Imperial Cup in Taipei but lost to Paula Kania, in straight sets.

2014: Breakthrough and top 50

The 2014 season was Diyas' breakthrough year. First she played at the $25k event in Hong Kong, reaching the final, in which she lost to Elizaveta Kulichkova. Then, she entered Australian Open qualifying, registering a close three-set win over Aleksandra Krunić in the first round. In order to get to the main-draw she defeated Andreea Mitu, followed with win over Canadian Stéphanie Dubois. This resulted in her first Grand Slam championship main-draw entry. In the first round, she then beat fellow qualifier Kateřina Siniaková, before she breezed past world No. 52, Marina Erakovic, to book her place in the third round. Diyas then went down to world No. 11, Simona Halep, in straight sets. Nevertheless, her two early-round wins helped boost her ranking to a then-career-high No. 112. Following the Australian Open, Diyas lost qualifying matches at the Pattaya Open and the Qatar Open. She bounced back quickly though, as she then easily won a $50k event in Quanzhou.

She then traveled to the United States to compete at the Miami Open, qualifying for the main draw and getting past Alexandra Cadanțu before losing to Sloane Stephens in the second round. Although she failed to qualify for the Charleston Open, she played at the Malaysian Open and advanced to the quarterfinals – her first WTA Tour quarterfinal since the 2010 Kremlin Cup. Diyas then went to Europe but lost early in the first two tournaments contested. At the Internationaux de Strasbourg, a French Open warm-up event, she returned to form with a win over world No. 22, Kirsten Flipkens, in the first round. She followed it up by dispatching Ajla Tomljanović before having to retire in her quarterfinal match against Christina McHale during the second set. Holding a world ranking of No. 86, Diyas was granted a spot in the main draw of the French Open but got a tough draw and was knocked out by Petra Kvitová in the first round. At the ITF grass-court tournament Nottingham Trophy, she advanced to the final but was narrowly beaten by Kristýna Plíšková. She played one more grass-court event before entering Wimbledon, at the Birmingham Classic, where she was eliminated by CoCo Vandeweghe in the first round. At Wimbledon, she got her first ever win by defeating Kristina Mladenovic in a rain-delayed straight-sets match. She followed this up with three-set wins against 15th seed Carla Suárez Navarro and 2010 Wimbledon finalist Vera Zvonareva, before losing in straight sets to third seed Simona Halep in the fourth round.

In late July, she returned to the United States to compete at the Washington Open, where she reached the second round. Then, at the Cincinnati Open, she advanced to another second round, losing there to Lucie Šafářová.

Then, in her best result at the US Open to date, the unseeded Diyas advanced to the women's singles third round where she lost in straight sets to 17th seed Ekaterina Makarova, earning $105,090. There, she also played in the doubles event, where alongside Xu Yifan she reached her first Grand Slam quarterfinal.

In Asia, she got to the second round at the Wuhan Open and the China Open, losing to Angelique Kerber in both second-round matches. After that, Diyas reached her first WTA Tour final at the Japan Women's Open where she lost to Samantha Stosur in straight sets. All of these helped her rise into the top 50. She finished year as world No. 34.

2015: Great start, second-half slump

Diyas came to the Shenzhen Open as part of Australian Open warm-up, where she got to the quarterfinal, losing to Zheng Saisai. Next week, she made another quarterfinal at the Hobart International, where Alison Riske stopped her from progressing further. Diyas was seeded 31st in singles at the Australian Open. She beat qualifier Urszula Radwańska of Poland in three sets in the first round and then unseeded Slovak Anna Karolína Schmiedlová in the second round in three sets, but she lost her third-round match against No. 2 seed and finalist Maria Sharapova, in straight sets. Diyas also played doubles with South African Chanelle Scheepers, and they advanced to the second round before losing to the 16th-seeded German team of Julia Görges and Anna-Lena Grönefeld, in straight sets.

In February, she traveled to Asia, playing at first in Pattaya at the Thailand Open, where she lost at the beginning of the tournament. At the Dubai Tennis Championships, a Premier 5 tournament, she won against two German players, Annika Beck and Andrea Petkovic, before she lost to Ekaterina Makarova in the next round. At the Qatar Open, she defeated Ons Jabeur in the first round, but Petkovic avenged her early Dubai exit by beating Diyas in the second round. At the Indian Wells Open, she got a bye in the first round for being seed No. 28. In the next round, she beat Donna Vekić before losing to Serena Williams. At the Miami Open, she also got a bye but lost in the second round to CiCi Bellis.

The clay-court season didn't start well for Diyas, as she lost in first round of the Charleston Open. Diyas followed up this performance by making double-bagel against Sabine Lisicki in the first round of the Premier-level Stuttgart Open but later did not make it to the quarterfinal, losing to Sara Errani. Her next step was Premier Mandatory Madrid Open, where she lost in round one to Carla Suárez Navarro. Next week, she played at the Italian Open, where she beat Tsvetana Pironkova before she lost to seed No. 6, Eugenie Bouchard. She finished clay season with playing at the French Open as 32nd seed. There, she defeated qualifier Dinah Pfizenmaier in the first round in straight sets, but lost to Alison Van Uytvanck in the following round.

Prior to Wimbledon, Diyas was defeated by lower-ranked players in two warm-up tournaments, losing to 129th-ranked Sachia Vickery at the Nottingham Open and to 146th-ranked Johanna Konta at the Eastbourne International. Diyas, however, reached the round of 16 at Birmingham by defeating Kateryna Bondarenko in straight sets and through the withdrawal of Victoria Azarenka. Diyas subsequently lost to 12th-ranked Karolína Plíšková. Despite the slow start on grass that left her unseeded at Wimbledon, Diyas managed to advance to the fourth round for the second consecutive year. She beat 24th seed Flavia Pennetta, qualifier Aliaksandra Sasnovich and 14th seed Andrea Petkovic. However, her stealthy run at Wimbledon was ended by the fourth seed Sharapova.

Her hardcourt season, did not go as well as her performance on grass. Diyas failed to win in all her pre-US Open tournaments. At Washington, Diyas had to retire against Lauren Davis after trailing a set and 2–1 down. She lost to lucky loser Julia Görges at the Canadian Open, to Venus Williams at the Cincinnati Open and to Irina-Camelia Begu at the Connecticut Open – all in the first round. In the first round of the US Open, Diyas was defeated by Polona Hercog. This meant that she failed to repeat her third-round appearance from the previous year.

By the end of the year, she was still not doing well. At the Japan Women's Open, she defeated Kiki Bertens in the first round, her last win of the 2015 season. In the second round, she lost to Magda Linette. In her next three tournaments, she lost in the first round to Madison Brengle at the Pan Pacific Open, to Irina-Camelia Begu at the Wuhan Open and to Monica Puig at the China Open. Diyas finished the year ranked world No. 52.

2016: Wrist injury

Diyas started the year playing at the Shenzhen Open, where she recorded her first win of the season against qualifier Zhang Kailin. In the second round, she was eliminated by Kateřina Siniaková. In her next two tournaments, she lost in the first round, at the Hobart International to Camila Giorgi and at the Australian Open to Madison Keys. At the Qatar Open, she was eliminated by Jeļena Ostapenko.

In March, she traveled to the United States, where her first event was the Indian Wells Open. She beat Jamie Loeb in the first round, but could not beat Azarenka in the next round. At the Miami Open, she defeated Olga Govortsova and Daria Gavrilova and went one round further, where Serena Williams eliminated her from the tournament. On clay, she reached two second rounds: the Internationaux de Strasbourg, where she lost to Alla Kudryavtseva, and the French Open, where she lost to Simona Halep.

Diyas suffered a wrist injury in round one of Wimbledon, where she lost to Anna-Lena Friedsam. Later she underwent surgery. She did not play in any tournaments in 2016 after that. As a result, she fell out of the top 100.

2017: Return to tour, first WTA title

Her attempt to return from her injury started with a series of losses. She lost in the opening rounds of her first four tournaments of the season before scoring her first wins at the Blossom Cup in Quanzhou, reaching the quarterfinals and losing to Zheng. Then, she won her first ITF title since June 2014 at a $25k tournament in Nanning. The following week, she managed to reach the quarterfinals of the WTA 125 Zhengzhou Open but then lost to the top seed Peng Shuai. Her next step was the $100k tournament in Anning, Kunming Open, where she reached the final but lost to Zheng again. She then came to Japan to play at the $80k Kangaroo Cup in Gifu but did not do well, losing to Luksika Kumkhum in the first round. Things get better in the following week, when she was advanced to the semifinals of the $60k Fukuoka International but lost to Magdaléna Rybáriková. Diyas then failed to qualify for the main draw of the French Open as she lost to Bethanie Mattek-Sands, after defeating Sachia Vickery and Polona Hercog in the first two qualifying rounds.

Diyas started grass-court season with a first-round loss at the Surbiton Trophy but then following week won the $100k Manchester Trophy, scoring victories against Emily Webley-Smith, Arina Rodionova, Magdalena Fręch, Naomi Broady and Aleksandra Krunić without dropping a set. At Wimbledon, Diyas was given a wildcard into the main draw. She won her first two matches against Han Xinyun and Arina Rodionova but lost to another returning player, Petra Martić, in the third round.

At the Japan Women's Open, Diyas won all her qualifying matches to reach the main draw. She went on to score victories against several higher-ranked players, namely local favourite Misaki Doi, top 30 player Zhang Shuai, compatriot Yulia Putintseva and defending champion Christina McHale. In the final, she beat fellow qualifier Miyu Kato to win her first ever WTA title.

2018: Back in the top 100 and another injury
Diyas chose Shenzhen Open as her Australian Open warm-up tournament. There she recorded two wins before she lost to Sharapova in the quarterfinal. Diyas was ranked well inside the top 100 on New Year's Day of 2018 at No. 66, and thus was directly accepted into the main draw of a Grand Slam tournament at the Australian Open for the first time since the 2016 Wimbledon Championships. However, she lost in the first round to Sorana Cîrstea in three sets. In March, Diyas reached the fourth round of a Premier Mandatory event at the Miami Open but had to retire while a set down in her match against Karolína Plíšková.

In May, she reached the quarterfinals of a WTA Tour clay-court event for the first time in her career at Strasbourg, losing in straight sets to the eventual champion Anastasia Pavlyuchenkova. Subsequently, she won her opening match at the French Open, before losing in the second round to Naomi Osaka. In her first-round match against Sam Stosur at the Nottingham Open, Diyas suffered a serious knee injury that saw her miss the entire grass-court season. She returned for the US Open but lost in the first round to Karolína Plíšková. Diyas was also unsuccessful in defending her title at the Japan Women's Open, losing in the quarterfinals to No. 1 seed, Zhang Shuai.

2019–20: Australian Open third round, out of form

At the start of 2019, Diyas lost in the first round of the Australian Open to Aleksandra Krunić. First-round losses followed at the Dubai Championships and Indian Wells Open, and her failure to qualify for the Miami Open saw her once again drop out of the top 100. However, in May, Diyas won her eighth career ITF singles title at the Kangaroo Cup, which was enough to edge her back into the top 100.

Diyas began the new 2020 season at the Shenzhen Open, losing in the quarterfinals to Garbiñe Muguruza. She played at the Australian Open, facing No. 10, Kiki Bertens, in the third round but losing and missing a chance for her best finish at that tournament.

At the Cincinnati Open, she failed to qualify for the main draw. At the US Open, she lost in the first round to Bernarda Pera. Just like in her previous Premier-5 appearance, she failed to qualify for the main draw at the Italian Open. At her last event of 2020, she lost at the French Open in the first round to Ons Jabeur.

2021: Fourth Australian Open third round, out of top 100

2022: Continued struggles, out of top 1000

National representation

Billie Jean King Cup
Diyas made her senior Billie Jean King Cup debut for Kazakhstan in 2009, representing the team from 2009 to 2011, 2015 through 2016, and 2018 through 2019. The team competition was known as Fed Cup up until 2020. Diyas has played in 19 ties, compiling an overall record of 18–8 split between 14–5 in singles and 4–3 in doubles. When Diyas debuted for Kazakhstan, they were in Asia/Oceania Zone Group II. In order to be promoted to the group I for 2010 Fed Cup, Kazakhstan needed to win their round-robin group, which also consisted of Iran, Singapore and Hong Kong. They first played against Singapore, winning with a 3–0 score. After that, with the same score, they defeated Iran, when Diyas debuted, winning in doubles alongside Galina Voskoboeva with a double bagel. Kazakhstan were promoted to Zone Group I for 2010 after winning all matches against Singapore, Iran and Hong Kong. The following year, they came second in a group where they beat Thailand and Uzbekistan both by a 2–1 score, but lost to Chinese Taipei. That sent them to the playoff, where they defeated South Korea. Again, Diyas only played in doubles. Although she lost that match while partnering with Sesil Karatantcheva, Kazakhstan won another two singles matches and stayed in group I for 2011.  Being in group I in 2011, Kazakhstan had another chance to advance out of the Zone Group and play in the World Group II playoff, but they failed, coming second in their round-robin group. In a play-off of the Zone Group, they lost to Thailand and stayed in group I for 2012.

Diyas did not play any match for Kazakhstan from 2012 to 2014. During that time, Kazakhstan remained in Zone Group I. They had a chance to be promoted to World Group II in 2014 but lost the World Group II play-off in 2013 to France. On her return in 2015, Diyas won all of her three singles matches. That was enough for Kazakhstan to win their round-robin group; however, they later lost to Japan in the playoff, missing another chance to get to the World Group II playoff. The next year, Diyas only played singles matches and was victorious in both of them, but it was not enough for Kazakhstan to win their round-robin group. Later they played against India for 5th place in Zone Group I, but didn not win the tie. After one year of absence, Diyas not only returned to play at Fed Cup, but also played her first doubles match there since her debut in 2009. Kazakhstan was the winner of their round-robin group, where Diyas won all her five matches, three in singles and two in doubles. Nonetheless, in the playoff of Zone Group, they lost against Japan and missed their chance to play in the World Group II playoff to potentially get to the World Group II in 2019.

The 2019 Fed Cup was important for Diyas, being the first year when Kazakhstan advanced out of the Zone Group with Diyas as part of the team. In the World Group II playoff, Kazakhstan faced Great Britain. Diyas lost both of her singles matches, against Johanna Konta and Katie Boulter, despite winning the first set of both matches. In 2020, format of the Fed Cup changed, allowing Kazakhstan to be a part of the 2020 Fed Cup Qualifying Round. Kazakhstan played against Belgium for their place in the Finals round but lost 1–3. Diyas had two singles match losses against Kirsten Flipkens and Elise Mertens. Due to the COVID-19 pandemic, the 2020 Fed Cup was forced to be split into two years, so that the 2020 Fed Cup Finals round was postponed to 2021, when it was renamed the Billie Jean King Cup. Kazakhstan will play against Argentina in the Billie Jean King Cup Play-offs in 2021, where the winner of the tie will advance to the 2022 Billie Jean King Cup Qualifying Round.

Playing style

Diyas is primarily an aggressive baseliner whose game is centered around powerful and accurate groundstrokes. Her forehand, which generates a considerable amount of pace, is often used to move her opponents around the court and out of position, which therefore allows her to dominate and win points from or around the back of the court. Her serve, while not necessarily a weapon in her arsenal, is quite effective when placed properly and she employs a tactic of a delayed service motion, which often prevents her opponents from appropriately timing a return. While not a great mover on court, she is able to partly compensate for that with her tenacious fighting qualities.

Apparel and equipment
Dunlop sponsors Diyas, providing her racquets, clothing and shoes. She uses the Dunlop Srixon Revo CV 3.0 Tennis Racquet.

Coaching team
As a junior, Diyas was coached by Jaroslav Jandus when she was seventeen years old. After undergoing shoulder surgery in late 2011, she started working with Alan Ma in Guangzhou. In 2018, she split with Ma and started a collaboration with two Italians, Roberto Antonini as her coach and Carlo Bilardo as her athletic trainer.

Personal life
She has named Justine Henin, Martina Hingis, and Serena Williams as her tennis idols. Diyas is fluent in Russian, Czech, and English. In an interview with Tennis Prose, Diyas stated that her favourite tournament is Wimbledon, which she loves for its tradition and history.

In 2019, she won the Fed Cup Heart Award for the Asia/Oceania Zone Group I. She is the third player from Kazakhstan to win that award, and hers was the fourth won by a Kazakhstan national. In 2014, she was nominated for Newcomer of the Year but lost to Belinda Bencic.

Performance timelines

Only main-draw results in WTA Tour, Grand Slam tournaments, Fed Cup/Billie Jean King Cup and Olympic Games are included in win–loss records.

Singles
Current through the 2022 French Open.

Doubles

WTA career finals

Singles: 2 (1 title, 1 runner-up)

ITF Circuit finals

Singles: 18 (9 titles, 9 runner–ups)

Doubles: 1 (runner–up)

Fed Cup/Billie Jean King Cup participation

Singles: 17 (14–3)

Doubles: 4 (2–2)

Head-to-head records

Wins over top-10 players

Notes

References

External links
 
 
 

1993 births
Living people
Sportspeople from Almaty
Kazakhstani female tennis players
Expatriate sportspeople in the Czech Republic
Expatriate sportspeople in China
Tennis players at the 2020 Summer Olympics
Olympic tennis players of Kazakhstan